Scoop is a 2006 romantic crime comedy film written and directed by Woody Allen and starring Hugh Jackman, Scarlett Johansson, Ian McShane and Allen himself. It was released in the United States by Focus Features on July 28, 2006. The film follows an American journalist and a magician being guided by the spirit of a reporter to investigate a British aristocrat who might be a serial killer. Scoop received mixed reviews from critics regarding its humor, but was a box-office success, grossing $39.2 million against a $4 million budget.

Plot
Following the memorial service for investigative reporter Joe Strombel, Strombel's spirit finds himself on the barge of death with several others, including a young woman named Jane Cook who believes she was poisoned by her employer, Peter Lyman. Jane tells Strombel she thinks Lyman, a handsome British aristocrat with political ambitions, may be the Tarot Card Killer, a notorious serial killer of prostitutes, and that he killed her when she stumbled onto his secret. The Tarot Card Killer left a card on each murder victim's body.

Sondra Pransky is a beautiful but awkward American journalism student on vacation in London. Pransky attends a performance given by magician Sid Waterman, aka "The Great Splendini", and agrees to participate onstage. While in a booth known as The Dematerializer, Pransky encounters Strombel's ghost. The ghost has escaped the Grim Reaper himself to impart his suspicions of Lyman to a journalist who can investigate the story. Sondra decides to infiltrate Lyman's privileged world to find out if he truly is the dreaded criminal, enlisting Sid in the process and taking advantage of his powers of deception.

Sondra catches Lyman's attention by pretending to drown near him at an exclusive club's swimming pool. When he rescues her, she introduces herself as Jade Spence, daughter of a wealthy oil family from Palm Beach. While Sid poses as her father, "Jade" begins dating Lyman. Sondra is convinced Lyman is the murderer, but Sid finds it hard to believe. Sondra gradually falls in love with Lyman and begins to trust him. Sid meanwhile becomes less sanguine about Lyman as he notices more and more inconsistencies, especially after Sondra finds a Tarot deck hidden under a French horn in Peter's vault, a climate-controlled music room containing expensive antique musical instruments. Sid finally prevails upon Sondra to write a news story implicating Lyman, but the newspaper editor rejects the story because of Sondra's lack of proof. Throughout their investigation, Sid and Sondra have a relationship that is in turns friendly, paternal, and antagonistic—fueled largely by Sondra's annoyance that her smooth "Jade Spence" charade is being compromised by Sid's obnoxious attempts to act the part of a nouveau riche oil baron.

Soon the police arrest the real Tarot Card Killer. Sondra, relieved that her suspicions were for naught, reveals her real name and the deception she and Sid had practiced. Lyman is surprisingly gracious, and tells Sondra he wants to keep seeing her. They plan to spend the weekend at Lyman's isolated country estate. Later, Sid (at Strombel's urging) suggests that Lyman used the Tarot Card murders to cover up a murder he committed.

While Sondra and Lyman vacation in the country, Sid continues to investigate this theory. He finds that Lyman did frequent a prostitute, Betty Gibson, who was later killed, apparently by the Tarot Card Killer. Gibson is described as a "baby-faced blonde" (just like Sondra) before Lyman convinced her to dye her hair, presumably to match the profile of the other Tarot victims. When Sid calls Sondra with his findings, she waves them off. Unbeknownst to her, Lyman is listening in on another extension.

Sid breaks into Lyman's vault again, this time finding a mysterious key, which turns out to be to Betty Gibson's flat. Meanwhile, in a rowboat on Lyman's lake, Lyman confesses to Sondra that he killed Gibson to stop her from blackmailing him and used the Tarot Card pattern to allay suspicion, just as Strombel had told Sid. Lyman comments on the irony that he first met Sondra by saving her from drowning, and now she really would drown. He would kill Sid later; no one would connect an obscure stage magician's death to that of a clumsy journalism student. This scene is intercut with shots of Sid driving madly to the Lyman estate to rescue Sondra, ultimately ending in a car crash.

After his confession, Lyman throws Sondra into the lake and watches her go under. He then calls the police to report her drowning death. When they question him, he tells them Sondra was a terrible swimmer and almost drowned that first day at the pool. Suddenly, Sondra enters, soaking wet but smiling cheerfully. She informs Lyman and the police that the drowning had been an act to get his attention, and actually she was a very good swimmer.

Back in the newspaper offices, the editor who previously rejected Sondra's article now congratulates Sondra on a brilliant piece of investigative journalism, the start of a promising career. Sondra seems flattered, and says she must also credit Joe Strombel and the late Sid Waterman, Splendini, who is now a passenger on the Reaper's ship, performing for his fellow spirits the same magical gags and comedy routines he did in life.

Cast

Production
The lead character (originally an adult journalist) was tailored specifically to Johansson, whom Allen observed as having an unutilized "funny" quality about her while working on his previous film, Match Point.

Although it was filmed in London, the film is the second of Allen's films (the other being Hollywood Ending) not to have a UK theatrical release. It was given a British TV premiere on February 7, 2009 on BBC Two. The film eventually came out on DVD in the UK on February 9, 2015 through Icon Productions.

As is often the case with Allen's films, there is no original score. Most of the music heard in the film is by Pyotr Ilyich Tchaikovsky, Johann Strauss Jr., and Edvard Grieg.

Critical reception
Scoop received mixed reviews from critics. On the review aggregator Rotten Tomatoes, the film has a 41% approval rating based on 148 reviews, with an average score of 5.4/10. The website's critical consensus states: "Rehashing old plot lines and characters, Scoop is a tiresome dipper and another disappointing addition to Woody Allen's repertoire." Metacritic reported the film has an average score of 48 out of 100, based on 35 reviews, indicating "mixed or average reviews".

Stephen Hunter of The Washington Post called it the "worst movie Woody Allen has ever made":

At the other extreme, Mick LaSalle of the San Francisco Chronicle, who also gave positive reviews to Allen's Melinda and Melinda, called it "the funniest movie of the year so far" and Allen's funniest film in a decade. He also said:

Manohla Dargis of The New York Times called it "not especially funny yet oddly appealing":

Ty Burr of The Boston Globe called it "fluffy, fatally implausible farce":

The film was ranked as Allen's worst in a 2016 poll of Time Out contributors, with editor Dave Calhoun writing, "It's not radical to call it his low point." The same year, film critics Robbie Collin and Tim Robey ranked the film as one of Allen's weakest.

Box office
Scoop opened in 538 American theatres on July 28, 2006. In its first three days, it grossed $3,046,924 for a per-theatre-average of $5,663. Box Office Mojo listed its opening as the biggest limited release premiere of 2006. By the time the film's domestic run had ended on September 28, 2006, it grossed $10,525,717 in the U.S. and $39,212,510 worldwide. The film had a $4 million budget, not including prints and advertising expense.

References
Notes

Citations

External links
 
 
 

2006 films
2006 romantic comedy films
2000s American films
2000s British films
2000s buddy comedy films
2000s comedy mystery films
2000s crime comedy films
2000s English-language films
2000s fantasy comedy films
2000s romantic fantasy films
2000s serial killer films
American buddy comedy films
American comedy mystery films
American crime comedy films
American fantasy comedy films
American romantic comedy films
American romantic fantasy films
American serial killer films
BBC Film films
British buddy comedy films
British comedy mystery films
British crime comedy films
British fantasy comedy films
British romantic comedy films
British serial killer films
Films about journalists
Films about magic and magicians
Films directed by Woody Allen
Films produced by Gareth Wiley
Films produced by Letty Aronson
Films set in London
Films shot in London
Films shot at Pinewood Studios
Films with screenplays by Woody Allen
Films about personifications of death
Romantic crime films